5-Chloro-N,N-dimethyltryptamine (5-chloro-DMT) is a tryptamine derivative related to compounds such as 5-bromo-DMT and 5-fluoro-DMT. It acts as a serotonin receptor agonist and has primarily sedative effects in animal studies. It has been sold as a designer drug.

See also 
 5,N,N-TMT
 5-Chloro-AMT
 5-TFM-DMT
 6-Fluoro-AMT
 6-Fluoro-DMT
 7-Chloro-AMT

References 

Tryptamines
Chloroarenes
Dimethylamino compounds